Paramollugo nudicaulis, also known by its common name smooth carpetweed, is a species from the genus Paramollugo.

References

Molluginaceae
Plants described in 2016